Ford has marketed the following automobiles models using the Ford Maverick nameplate:

 The Ford Maverick (1970–1977), a compact car sold in North America and Brazil during the 1970s
 The rebadged Nissan Patrol Y60 sold by Ford Australia under the Button car plan from 1988 to 1994
 The rebadged Spanish-built Nissan Terrano II, sold by Ford of Europe from 1993 to 1999
 The European and Chinese version of the Ford Escape, sold from 2001 to 2005
 The Ford Maverick (2022), a compact pickup truck sold in the Americas

Maverick

lt:Ford Maverick